The Bowdoin Square Theatre (est.1892) in Boston, Massachusetts, was a playhouse and cinema. It was located on Bowdoin Square in the West End, in a building designed by architect C.H. Blackall. Personnel included Charles F. Atkinson and William Harris. Audience members included future magician Julius Linsky and future actor Joseph Sicari

Performances/Screenings

1890s
 The Dazzler
 A Parlor Match (Evans and Hoey)
 The Idea, with Hallen and Hart
 Sutton Vane's The Span of Life
 Hands Across the Sea
 The Cotton King
 John P. Smith's Uncle Tom's Cabin, with Jenny Kay
 Daniel A. Kelly's Outcasts of a Great City

1900s
 The Victorian Cross
 In Sight of St. Pauls, with Zeffie Tilbury
 Utah, with Zeffie Tilbury
 A Break for Liberty
 Two Orphans
 The Cattle King
 Wicked London
 Escaped from Sing Sing

1910s
 War's Women ("moving picture"), with Frank Keenan
 Ting Shan Wang Troupe
 Patria (film), with Mrs. Vernon Castle

1920s
 Camille (film), with Nazimova
 From the Ground Up (film), with Tom Moore
 Burn 'em up Barnes, with Johnny Hines
 Gleam o' Dawn (film), with John Gilbert
 "Drake and Walker's Big Colored Musical Revue"

1930s-1950s

References

Further reading
 "Olga Nethersole Brings Suit; Seeks to Enjoin a Boston Theatre from Presenting "Sapho." New York Times, May 17, 1900,
 "Boston Actress Shot; Unknown Person Wounds Miss Edith Talbot -- Her Engagement Was Announced Last Monday." New York Times, February 16, 1901.

External links

 Boston Public Library. Photo of Bowdoin Sq., ca.1900s? Shows Bowdoin Sq. Theatre and vicinity
 CinemaTreasures.org. Bowdoin Square Theatre, Bowdoin Square, Boston, MA

1892 establishments in Massachusetts
19th century in Boston
Cultural history of Boston
Former cinemas in the United States
Former theatres in Boston
Theatres completed in 1892
West End, Boston